Castle Rock is a scenic viewpoint in Adirondack Mountains of New York located northwest of Blue Mountain Lake.

References

Mountains of Hamilton County, New York
Mountains of New York (state)